Liodora (Greek: Λιοδώρα) is a small village in Arcadia, the central region of the Peloponnese area of Greece.

Liodora is part of the Municipal Unit of Iraia, which belongs to the Municipality of Gortynia. It is situated on a low hill near the left bank of the river Ladon, 5 km northeast of Tripotamia, 8 km west of Paloumpa and 17 km northwest of Dimitsana, the capital of the Municipality.

Geography
Liodora is situated in a hilly plateau and features several hills.  The view to the south are blocked by a mountain slope.  Kryonero has several valleys around the area, which also contains forests, grasslands, farmlands and bushes.

Information

Its main production are olives, citrus, fruits, vegetables and other crops, as well as life stock products.  The village can be seen as far as to the north and east.

History 
The name Liodora was probably derived from Heliodorus (Greek: Ηλιόδωρος) or Leodorus (Greek: Λεόδωρος), an ancient ruler or nobleman of the area, or it is a derivative of the word "Herodora" (Greek: Ηροδώρα), denoting Hera, the wife of Zeus, giving gifts. About 5 km to the south of the contemporary village was Ancient Irea, a city built next to the Alfeios River, close to Ancient Olympia. In the Middle Ages, the village was the capital of the entire region, which also bared its name.

The location of the lost ancient city of Melaneai (Greek: Μελανεαί) is believed to be in the vicinity of contemporary Liodora. Outside the village there is also an ancient cheese factory.

Population
The permanent population of Liodora is currently around 50 people, a number which is more than doubled during holiday seasons. Following is the evolution of the official census figures on the village's population.

See also
List of settlements in Arcadia

External links
Information about Liodora (in Greek)
Liodora on the GTP Travel Pages

References

Populated places in Arcadia, Peloponnese